Motown 1s is a collection of 25 #1 songs originally released by Motown Records, plus a newly recorded bonus track, "Ain't No Mountain High Enough," performed by Michael McDonald. It was released by Motown Records/UTV Records in 2004.

Track listing
 Motown 1s Intro (0:04) 
 "Please Mr. Postman" - The Marvelettes (2:29)
 "(Love Is Like a) Heat Wave" - Martha and the Vandellas (2:44)
 "My Guy" - Mary Wells (2:53)
 "My Girl" - The Temptations (2:56)
 "Where Did Our Love Go" - The Supremes (2:41)
 "Stop! In the Name of Love" - The Supremes (2:59)
 "Shotgun" - Junior Walker & The All-Stars (2:57)
 "I Can't Help Myself (Sugar Pie Honey Bunch)" - Four Tops (2:45)
 "Uptight (Everything's Alright)" - Stevie Wonder (2:54)
 "Ain't Too Proud to Beg" - The Temptations (2:33)
 "Reach Out I'll Be There" - Four Tops (3:00)
 "Ain't Nothing Like the Real Thing" - Marvin Gaye & Tammi Terrell (2:15)
 "I Heard It Through the Grapevine" - Marvin Gaye (3:15)
 "I Want You Back" - The Jackson 5 (3:00)
 "War" - Edwin Starr (3:21)
 "The Tears of a Clown" - Smokey Robinson & The Miracles (3:01)
 "What's Going On" - Marvin Gaye (3:52)
 "Let's Get It On" - Marvin Gaye (4:02)
 "Love Machine (Part 1)" - The Miracles  (2:59)
 "Don't Leave Me This Way" - Thelma Houston (3:40)
 "Three Times a Lady" - Commodores (3:38)
 "Endless Love" - Diana Ross & Lionel Richie (4:26)
 "Rhythm of the Night" - DeBarge (3:55)
 "I'll Make Love to You" - Boyz II Men (3:57)
 "Ain't No Mountain High Enough" - Michael McDonald (2:48)

Charts

See also
 Motown discography

References

Record label compilation albums
2004 compilation albums
Motown compilation albums
Soul compilation albums
Rhythm and blues compilation albums
Pop compilation albums